is a railway station in the city of  Toyohashi, Aichi Prefecture, Japan, operated by the Public–private partnership Toyohashi Railroad. The station is physically adjacent to Toyohashi Station.

Lines
Shin-Toyohashi Station is a terminal station of the Atsumi Line, and is located 18.0 kilometers from the opposing terminus of the line at Mikawa-Tahara Station.

Station layout
The station has a single dead-headed island platform. The station is staffed.

Adjacent stations

|-
!colspan=5|Toyohashi Railroad

Station history
Shin-Toyohashi Station was established by the privately-held Atsumi Railroad on October 1, 1927. On September 1, 1940, the Atsumi Railway became part of the Nagoya Railway system, and was spun out again as the Toyohashi Railway on October 1, 1954. In 2008, the station was expanded, with its side platform changed to an island platform, and the station building replaced by an elevated three-story station building.

Passenger statistics
In fiscal 2017, the station was used by an average of 18,228 passengers daily.

Surrounding area
downtown Toyohashi city

See also
 List of railway stations in Japan

References

External links

Toyohashi Railway Official home page

Railway stations in Aichi Prefecture
Railway stations in Japan opened in 1927
Toyohashi